Nicolas Boindin (29 May 1676 – 30 November 1751) was an 18th-century French writer and playwright.

Works 
Theatre
1701: Les Trois Gascons, comedy in 1 act, with Antoine Houdar de La Motte, Paris, Théâtre de la rue des Fossés Saint-Germain, 4 June
1702: Le Bal d'Auteuil, comedy in 3 acts, Paris, Théâtre de la rue des Fossés Saint-Germain, 22 August 
1702: La Matrone d'Éphèse, comédie, avec Antoine Houdar de La Motte
1704: Le Port de mer, comédie en 1 acte et en prose, Paris, Théâtre de la rue des Fossés Saint-Germain, 27 May
1753: Le Petit-Maître de robe, comedy in one act and in prose
Memoires
1717–1718: Lettres historiques à Mr D*** sur la nouvelle Comédie italienne, dans lesquelles il est parlé de son établissement, du caractère des acteurs qui la composent, des pièces qu'ils ont représentées jusqu'à présent, et des aventures qui y sont arrivées, Text online : 1re lettre 2e lettre 3e lettre
1719: Lettres historiques sur tous les spectacles de Paris, Text online(Lettre sur la Comédie française. Lettre sur l'Opéra. Lettre sur la Comédie italienne. Lettre sur les foires de Saint-Germain et de Saint Laurent.)
1752: Mémoire pour servir à l'histoire des couplets de 1710, attribués faussement à M. Rousseau (par N. Boindin). Le véritable paquet adressé à M. Boindin et, par conséquent, le vrai corps du délit, Text online
1753: Mémoires pour servir à l'histoire du célèbre Rousseau, où l'on prouve que les fameux couplets qui lui ont été faussement attribués sont réellement de La Motte, Saurin et Malafer. Nouvelle édition, augmentée du vrai caractère de Rousseau, en deux lettres de M. Racine et une de M. l'abbé d'Olivet
1761: Discours sur la forme et la construction du théâtre des anciens
Collected works
1746: Œuvres de théâtre, Text online
1753: Œuvres de monsieur Boindin, 2 vol., Text online 2

Bibliography 
 « Notice sur Boindin », in Suite du répertoire du Théâtre Français. Comédies en prose, Paris, chez Mme veuve Dabo, tome 1, 1822, (p. 121-125)
 Pierre Larousse, Grand Dictionnaire universel du XIXe siècle, vol. II, 1868, (p. 877)

External links 
 Nicolas Bouindin on 
 His plays and their presentations on CÉSAR

18th-century French writers
18th-century French male writers
18th-century French dramatists and playwrights
1676 births
Writers from Paris
1751 deaths